State Route 339 (SR 339) is a  state highway in Lyon County, Nevada, United States. It starts at State Route 208 east of Wilson Canyon and it parallels that route to the west north to U.S. 95 Alternate (Goldfield Avenue) in Yerington.

Major intersections

References

339
Transportation in Lyon County, Nevada